The first season of the animated television series, The Boondocks originally aired in the United States on Cartoon Network's late night programming block, Adult Swim. Season one started on November 6, 2005, with "The Garden Party" and ended with "The Passion of Reverend Ruckus" on March 19, 2006, with a total of fifteen episodes.

All fifteen episodes from season one were released completely uncensored on a three-disc DVD set in the United States on July 25, 2006. The first season is also available on the iTunes Store and has been made available for on demand streaming on HBO Max (originally shown on Netflix and then, Hulu).

Production
Anthony Bell, Joe Horne, Seung Eun Kim, and Kalvin Lee served as directors, and series creator Aaron McGruder, Rodney Barnes, and Yamara Taylor served as writers for season one. All episodes in season one originally aired in the United States on Cartoon Network's late night programming block, Adult Swim, and are rated TV-MA for graphic violence and dangerous activity involving children, explicit language (mostly heavy use of racist, sexist, and homophobic slurs, as well as bleeped-out profanity), and infrequent instances of strong sexual content, with the exception of "The Itis", which was rated TV-14 for drug references and moderate violence. 

Season one features guest appearances from Charlie Murphy, Ed Asner, Adam West, Katt Williams, Terry Crews, Samuel L. Jackson, Mos Def, Sway Calloway, Quincy Jones, Judge Reinhold, Xzibit, John C. McGinley, Kevin Michael Richardson, Candi Milo, Rob Paulsen, and Mike Epps.

Episodes

Home media
All fifteen episodes from season one were released uncensored on a three-disc DVD set in the United States on July 25, 2006.

References

The Boondocks (TV series) seasons
2005 American television seasons
2006 American television seasons